The Kawasaki Z900 is a standard motorcycle of the Kawasaki Z series made by Kawasaki since 2017. It replaced the Z800.

References 

Z900
Standard motorcycles
Motorcycles introduced in 2017